Bobby Bradley (born May 29, 1996) is an American professional baseball first baseman who is currently a free agent. He has played in Major League Baseball (MLB) for the Cleveland Indians / Guardians.

Early life
Bradley was born May 29, 1996, in Gulfport, Mississippi. He attended Harrison Central High School in Gulfport.

Career

Professional career

Bradley was drafted by the Cleveland Indians in the third round of the 2014 Major League Baseball draft. He signed with the Indians rather than play college baseball at Louisiana State University. Bradley made his professional debut that season with the Arizona League Indians. He won the Arizona League Triple Crown after leading the league in batting average (.361), home runs (eight) and runs batted in (50) in 39 games. After the season, he was named the league's MVP. Following his breakout 2014 season, Bradley spent 2015 with the Lake County Captains where he posted a .269 batting average with 27 home runs and 92 RBIs in 108 games. Bradley spent 2016 with the Lynchburg Hillcats where he batted .235 with 29 home runs and 102 RBIs in 131 games, and in 2017, Bradley played for the Akron RubberDucks where he hit .251 with 23 home runs and 89 RBIs, along with posting a .796 OPS in 131 games.

MLB.com ranked Bradley as Cleveland's third ranked prospect going into the 2018 season. He spent the year with both Akron and the Columbus Clippers, slashing a combined .224/.308/.466 with 27 home runs and 83 RBIs in 129 games.

The Indians added Bradley to their 40-man roster after the 2018 season. He returned to Columbus to begin 2019. On May 13, 2019, he was named to MLB Pipeline’s Prospect Team of the Week.

On June 23, 2019, Bradley was called up to the major leagues for the first time. Later that day he made his MLB debut, batting 1 for 3 with a RBI double in his first MLB at-bat. Bradley hit his first Major League home run on July 13, 2019 against the Minnesota Twins. Bradley did not make an appearance for the Indians in 2020.

Bradley began the 2021 season with the Columbus Clippers of the newly-formed Triple-A East. On June 5, 2021, Bradley was recalled by the Indians to their active roster.

Bradley was designated for assignment by the Guardians on May 1, 2022. After clearing waivers, Bradley was outrighted to the minor leagues on May 5, 2022. He was released by the Guardians organization on August 6, 2022.

References

Citations

Sources

External links

1996 births
Living people
African-American baseball players
Sportspeople from Gulfport, Mississippi
Baseball players from Mississippi
Major League Baseball first basemen
Cleveland Indians players
Cleveland Guardians players
Arizona League Indians players
Lake County Captains players
Lynchburg Hillcats players
Akron RubberDucks players
Columbus Clippers players
Glendale Desert Dogs players
21st-century African-American sportspeople